A sideshow is an extra, secondary production associated with a circus, carnival or fair etc.

Sideshow or Side Show may also refer to:

Brands and computing
Windows SideShow, a Microsoft technology for Windows Vista
Sideshow Collectibles, a California-based designer toy and collectible studio

Films and theatre
The Sideshow (film), a 1928 American silent drama film
The Side Show, 1929 Vitaphone sound short directed by Doc Salomon
Side Show (musical), a 1997 Broadway musical
Sideshow (1950 film), an American crime film
Sideshow (2000 film), a horror film
Side Show (film), a 1931 musical comedy film
 Sideshow, a 1974 play by Miguel Piñero

Music
The Side Show (nightclub), Cape Town, South Africa.
Sideshow, a 2004 comedy album by The Bob and Tom Show
Sideshow (album), a 1992 album by 8 Bold Souls
"Sideshow" (song), a 1974 song by Blue Magic
"Sideshow", a 1994 song by Alice Cooper from the album The Last Temptation

Television
Sideshow Bob, a character from The Simpsons
Sideshow Mel, Bob's replacement in The Simpsons
The Sideshow (TV series), an Australian comedy/variety TV show
Sideshow, a shapechanging superhero from Milestone Comics
The Side Show Countdown with Nikki Sixx

Other
Sideshow alley, an Australian term for amusements
Sideshow (automobile exhibition), an illegal automotive skills event that originated in Oakland, California
 Sideshow: Kissinger, Nixon and the Destruction of Cambodia, a 1979 book by William Shawcross